Brandon Kristopher Miller (born December 26, 1989 in Charlotte, North Carolina) is a retired American soccer player who played as a goalkeeper.

Playing career

Club

Rochester Rhinos
In December 2011, Miller started is professional career signing with the Rochester Rhinos in the USL Pro. After several seasons playing backup, Miller had a breakout season in 2015. Earning 24 appearances, Miller set USL records in both shutouts (13) and goals-against average (0.54). His achievements earned him the 2015 USL Goal Keeper of the Year Award.

Orange County Blues
Ahead of the 2016 season, Miller signed with Orange County Blues FC. Miller helped the Blues return to the playoffs, but they did not reach the Western Conference finals for a second consecutive season.

Harrisburg City Islanders
In March 2017, Miller moved back to the USL Eastern Conference and joined the Harrisburg City Islanders. Miller established himself as first choice keeper, but the City Islanders struggled to gain form in 2017 finishing 11th in the Eastern Conference.

Charlotte Independence
In January 2018, Miller returned to Charlotte signing with Charlotte Independence. In December 2021, Miller announced his retirement from playing professional soccer.

Achievements
United Soccer League
Championship
Winners : 2015
USL Regular Season
Winners: 2015
Eastern Conference
Winners (Playoffs): 2015
Winners (Regular season): 2015

References

External links
 
 

1989 births
Living people
American soccer players
Association football goalkeepers
Charlotte Independence players
Indiana Invaders players
Orange County SC players
Penn FC players
Rochester New York FC players
Soccer players from Charlotte, North Carolina
UNC Wilmington Seahawks men's soccer players
USL Championship players
USL League Two players